USS LST-42 was a United States Navy  used exclusively in the Asiatic-Pacific Theater during World War II. Like many of her class, she was not named and is properly referred to by her hull designation.

Construction 
LST-42 was laid down on 17 June 1943, at Pittsburgh, Pennsylvania, by the Dravo Corporation; launched on 17 August 1943; sponsored by Mrs. F. M. Leslie; and commissioned on 30 September 1943.

Service history  
During World War II, LST-42 was assigned to the Asiatic-Pacific theater.

Following the war, LST-42 was redesignated LST(H)-41 on 15 September 1945. She performed occupation duty in the Far East until early April 1945.

Upon her return to the United States, the ship was decommissioned on 26 July 1946, and struck from the Navy list on 25 September 1946. On 26 March 1948, she was sold to Kaiser Co., Inc., of Seattle, Washington.

Awards
LST-42 earned five battle stars for World War II service.

References

Bibliography 

 
 

 

World War II amphibious warfare vessels of the United States
Ships built in Pittsburgh
1943 ships
LST-1-class tank landing ships of the United States Navy
Ships built by Dravo Corporation